The Serjeant at Arms of the House of Commons is a parliamentary official responsible for order in the House of Commons. The office dates to 1415 and traditionally included responsibility for security.  The role is now mainly ceremonial.

The House of Lords also had a Serjeant-at-Arms (the title was often distinguished by the use of hyphens), dating also from the 15th century. His  duties were merged in 1971 with those of Black Rod.

Traditionally the post of Serjeant at Arms was filled by a retired military officer, but in 2008 a civil servant, Jill Pay, was selected as the first woman to hold the appointment. At the same time the job was split, with many of the duties transferred to the new post of chief executive.

Ugbana Oyet holds the post .

Duties

The duties of the Serjeant at Arms are partly ceremonial. The Serjeant at Arms carries the mace during the opening of Parliament and is also responsible for maintaining order during debates in the House of Commons, escorting members out of the chamber if ordered to do so by the Speaker.

In rare cases, the Serjeant at Arms may be called upon to enforce the warrants of the Speaker in summoning a witness to testify before a select committee of the house. While serving the warrant and encouraging a witness to attend parliament "the Serjeant or his appointee may call on the full assistance of the civil authorities, including the police." In January 1992, the Serjeant at Arms was employed to summon Ian and Kevin Maxwell, the sons of the disgraced business tycoon Robert Maxwell, to attend an inquiry held by the Social Security Select Committee into the operation of the Mirror Group Pension fund. In November 2018, the Serjeant at Arms was called upon to escort an American businessman, who was staying in London, to the Houses of Parliament because he had documents pertaining to the Facebook–Cambridge Analytica data scandal. After being told he could face arrest, fines and imprisonment for failing to comply with a parliamentary order to hand over the documents, the man eventually complied with the request.

Dress
The Serjeant at Arms wears traditional court dress and carries a sword, and is traditionally the only person allowed to be armed (with sword or mace) inside the chamber of the House of Commons.

List of Serjeants at Arms

See also
Serjeant-at-Arms

External links
Records of the Department of the Serjeant at Arms are kept at the Parliamentary Archives

References

 Serjeant-at-Arms